Tomosvaryellini is a tribe of big-headed flies (insects in the family Pipunculidae).

Genera
Dorylomorpha Aczél, 1939
Tomosvaryella Aczél, 1939

References

Pipunculidae
Brachycera tribes